Albert Burger (1925–1981) was a German politician of the Christian Democratic Union (CDU) and former member of the German Bundestag.

Life 
Burger joined the CDU in 1947. Later he was elected chairman of the Emmendingen district CDU association. From 1966 to 1977 he was deputy chairman of the CDU district association of South Baden. From 1966 to 1981 he was also chairman of the Christian Democratic Workers' Union of South Baden.

Burger had been a council member of the Kollnau community since 1953. In 1956, he was elected to the district council of the Emmendingen district, of which he was a member until 1964, and had been chairman of the CDU faction there since 1959. From 1964 until he resigned from office on 31 October 1965, he was a member of the Baden-Württemberg Landtag. He was a member of the German Bundestag from 1965 until his death. In Parliament he represented the constituency of Emmendingen - Wolfach from 1965 to 1980 and subsequently the constituency of Emmendingen - Lahr.

Literature

References

1925 births
1981 deaths
Members of the Bundestag for Baden-Württemberg
Members of the Bundestag 1980–1983
Members of the Bundestag 1976–1980
Members of the Bundestag 1972–1976
Members of the Bundestag 1969–1972
Members of the Bundestag 1965–1969
Members of the Bundestag for the Christian Democratic Union of Germany
Members of the Landtag of Baden-Württemberg